Calotes emma, commonly known as the forest garden lizard or Emma Gray's forest lizard, is a species of lizard in the family Agamidae. The species is native to China, South Asia, and Southeast Asia. There are two recognized subspecies.

Etymology
The specific name, emma, is in honor of English conchologist Maria Emma Gray, the wife of John Edward Gray, the describer of this species.

Morphology
C. emma has the following morphology.

Physical Structure: There are three small groups of spines, completely separate from each other, on each side of the head, one behind the superciliary margin and two above each tympanum. The dorsal crest is well developed on the neck and on the anterior part of the trunk, gradually disappearing behind. There is a transverse fold in front of each shoulder, and the gular sac is but little developed. The tail is laterally compressed. There are about 51 series of scales round the middle of the trunk.

Color pattern: The dorsum is brownish olive, with brown bands across the back, which are lighter in the middle and interrupted by a white band running along each side of the back. The eyelids have short, radiating brown streaks. There is a brown band from behind the eye to above the tympanum. The fold before the shoulder is black, with an irregular white margin. The legs and tail have indistinct dark crossbands.

Geographic range
C. emma is found in Bangladesh (Satchari National Park, Bandarban Hill District), Cambodia, China (Guangdong, Yunnan), India (Assam), Laos, Malaysia (Peninsular), Myanmar, Thailand (including Phuket) & Vietnam (including Pulo Condore Islands) and Possibly in Bhutan.

"An inhabitant of Mergui, whence we have received it from Professor Oldham, ranging northwards perhaps to the Khasya Hills; extremely doubtful as an inhabitant of Afghanistan. Mr. Blyth mentions it amongst a collection made by Captain Bedmore at Schwe Gyen on the Sitang River in Pegu".

Vernacular names
Vernacular names for C. emma in various languages include the following.

Bengali: কেশর গিরিগিটি, ঝুঁটি গিরিগিটি, ঝুঁটি রক্তচোষা, যুথিয়াল গিরিগিটি (Juthial girigiti)
Burmese: Poat-Tin-Nyo
Chinese: 棕背树蜥
English: crested forest lizard, Emma Gray's crested forest lizard, Emma Gray's forest lizard, spiny-headed forest lizard.

Behavior and habitat
C. emma is terrestrial, arboreal, and diurnal. It inhabits various forest habitats including dry deciduous, coastal, and moist evergreen.

Diet
C. emma is insectivorous, preying upon termites, grasshoppers, ants, cockroaches, beetles, diverse species of moths and low flying butterflies, and soil-living insects and their larvae.

Reproduction
C. emma is oviparous. The adult female lays 10-12 eggs in May–June. The incubation period is about 60–70 days.

Human uses
C. emma is used in the pet trade. It plays a role in the ecosystem by eating various types of insects and otherwise.

Threat to humans
C. emma is non-venomous and completely harmless to humans.

IUCN threat status
C. emma has been evaluated as "Least Concern" (LC) by the IUCN.

Subspecies
Two subspecies of C. emma are recognized as being valid, including the nominotypical subspecies.

Calotes emma alticristatus  
Calotes emma emma

References

External links
Photographic image at Web.archive.org

Further reading
Boulenger GA (1885). Catalogue of the Lizards in the British Museum (Natural History). Second Edition. Volume I. ... Agamidæ. London: Trustees of the British Museum (Natural History). (Taylor and Francis, printers). xii + 436 pp. + Plates I–XXXII. (Calotes emma, p. 324 + Plate XXV, figure 1).
Boulenger GA (1890). The Fauna of British India, Including Ceylon and Burma. Reptilia and Batrachia. London: Secretary of State for India in Council. (Taylor and Francis, printers). xviii + 541 pp. (Calotes emma, pp. 137–138).
Schmidt KP (1925). "New Chinese Amphibians and Reptiles". American Museum Novitates (175): 1–3. (Calotes alticristatus, new species, p. 2).
Smith MA (1935). The Fauna of British India, Including Ceylon and Burma. Reptilia and Amphibia. Vol. II.—Sauria. London: Secretary of State for India in Council. (Taylor and Francis, printers). xiii + 440 pp. + Plate I + 2 maps. (Calotes emma, pp. 195–197, Figure 55 [two views of head]).

Calotes
Reptiles described in 1845
Taxa named by John Edward Gray
Reptiles of Bangladesh
Reptiles of Myanmar
Reptiles of Cambodia
Reptiles of China
Reptiles of India
Reptiles of Laos
Reptiles of Malaysia
Reptiles of Thailand
Reptiles of Vietnam